Til We See the Shore is the debut studio album by Christian alternative rock band Seabird.  The album was released on June 24, 2008 and contains material from their first two EPs, Spread Your Broken Wings and Try and Let Me Go On.  The album also spawned the band's first single, "Rescue".

Track listing

Personnel 
Aaron Morgan – vocals, keyboards
Ryan Morgan – guitar
Chris Kubik – bass
Aaron Hunt – drums
Jesse Chambers, Nate Yetton, and Christopher York – A&R
Jan Cook Creative – Director
Mastering by Jim DeMain
Mixing by Allen Salmon
Art Director:  Katie Moore
Engineer:  Allen Salmon and John Stinson
Photographer:  John Willis

Charts

References

2008 debut albums
Seabird (band) albums
Credential Recordings albums
Albums produced by Jacquire King